The LC is a leisure centre located in the city centre of Swansea, Wales, UK.  Originally Swansea Leisure Centre, it was re-branded as 'The LC' when the facility re-opened to the public on 1 March 2008 after a £32-million makeover. The LC's exterior has been revitalised by replacing the old concrete panels with clear glass, translucent glazing, and timber panelling.

History
Swansea Leisure Centre was built on the location of the former Swansea Victoria railway station, opened by the Queen during her silver jubilee celebrations in 1977.  The original centre featured the first wave machine to be installed in a leisure centre in Wales; it became one of Wales' top leisure facilities and a substantial tourist draw, attracting more than 800,000 users annually at its peak. After its closure in 2003, Swansea Council decided to refurbish the centre, which was reopened - again by the Queen - on 7 March 2008.

Features
The LC's waterpark features include water slides, surf simulator, a 30 ft climbing wall, an indoor play area, a multi-purpose sports and exhibition hall (which was an official training facility for the 2012 London Olympics), exercise areas, and a spa and sauna section.

Logo
The "LC" logo was designed to be intentionally ambiguous, with the '2' implying the relaunch of the old Swansea Leisure Centre, or a wave and some mountains, signifying Swansea and the surrounding area or the surf simulator and climb wall inside the LC, or a swan, representing Swansea.

See also
 Swansea Victoria railway station the former station.

References

External links

SurfGSD now offer Indoor surfing lessons on the indoor machine at Swansea's new leisure centre
Official LC Swansea website
City & County of Swansea: Pictures of the redeveloped Swansea Leisure Centre

Sports venues in Swansea
Tourist attractions in Swansea
Swimming venues in Wales
Water parks in the United Kingdom
Buildings and structures in Swansea